J. Edward Leithead was an American writer.  His works included
 Bloody Hoofs (Ace Double D-2, 1952); bound dos-à-dos with William Colt MacDonald's Bad Man's Return.
 Bronc Buckeroo (Avon 170, 1952).
 Lead Slingers (Ace Double D-18, 1953); bound dos-à-dos with Brad Ward's Hanging Hills.
"Lobo McBain" a complete novel appearing in Ace-High Magazine, Second November Number, 1925.

Western (genre) writers
American male novelists